The Hitcher II: I've Been Waiting is a 2003 American direct-to-DVD road thriller film directed by Louis Morneau and starring C. Thomas Howell, returning as Jim Halsey, Kari Wuhrer as his girlfriend Maggie, and Jake Busey as psychotic hitchhiker Jack. It is the sequel to the 1986 film The Hitcher. The film was released on direct-to-DVD in the United States on July 15, 2003.

Plot
Fifteen years after the events of The Hitcher, Jim Halsey (C. Thomas Howell) now works as a police officer. He has recently been suspended for using excessive force on a kidnapping suspect, and decides to visit retired Captain Esteridge in Texas to talk about his lingering mental issues. Jim's girlfriend, Maggie (Kari Wuhrer), who has a crop dusting business, is unaware of Jim's past and pleads to come along.

Arriving in Texas, the couple pick up a car that Estridge has left for them, and set off to his house. The drive on the lonely road triggers Jim's PTSD, and when they see an RV that has been run off the road, blood dripping through the door, Jim refuses to stop and help. A motorcycle speeds past them and crashes. Maggie insists they take the driver on board. The Hitcher (Jake Busey) is insistent on making small talk and joking with them, but Jim is overwhelmed and evicts him from the car.

Jim and Maggie are eventually pulled over by a cop, but have been also followed by the Hitcher, who has hijacked an 18-wheeler truck and killed its driver. The Hitcher shoots the cop and tries to grab Jim and Maggie but is thrown off the car when they escape.

The couple arrive at the Esteridge residence late at night, but the Captain and his wife have been killed by the Hitcher. Jim and Maggie are caught in a shootout between the Hitcher, who is in the hayloft of the barn, and the local police, who have arrived on the scene. Jim pushes Maggie out of harm's way and is shot by the Hitcher. As he dies, he tells her to kill the Hitcher. Maggie escapes in her car.

Maggie falls asleep in the desert. When she wakes up, she is knocked unconscious and put inside an abandoned water tower on the verge of collapsing. The Hitcher taunts her and then leaves. Maggie escapes and uses his 18-wheeler to get away. She arrives at a gas station, makes a phone call and cleans up. The Hitcher has followed her and kills the clerk. He intends to frame Maggie for all the killings, and as part of this plan cuts off his own finger. The police arrive at the gas station. The Hitcher spins his story and Maggie is arrested. She is transported by the sheriff's van, but during the journey the vehicle is knocked on its side by an excavator. The Hitcher kills all the police officers of the escort, and tosses the key and a revolver to Maggie to make it look like she killed them.

Maggie kamikazes a mail carrier plane from a nearby airfield into the Hitcher's stolen tanker truck, but escapes the ensuing explosion. She finds the unconscious Hitcher and ties him to the truck. When he wakes up, realizing he is trapped, he begs for mercy. Before Maggie can execute him, the police show up. The Hitcher yells that Maggie is trying to kill him. The police free the Hitcher and shoot Maggie in the leg as she attempts to enter the truck's cab. Once free, the Hitcher kills the cops. Maggie gets a safe distance away and shoots the tanker, which explodes and kills the Hitcher. Maggie drops the shotgun to the ground and stands in the road, facing the remains of the burning truck.

Cast
 C. Thomas Howell as Jim Halsey
 Kari Wuhrer as Maggie
 Jake Busey as Jack, The Hitcher
 Janne Mortil as Sergeant Kibble
 Mackenzie Gray as Lieutenant
 Shaun Johnston as Sheriff Castillo
 Steve Railsback as Deputy Jessup (uncredited)

Reception
David Nusair of Reel Film gave the film one and a half stars, citing weak production values and the contrivance of the killer being a second hitchhiking maniac with no connection to the one from the first film. However, he praised C. Thomas Howell's performance, while noting that the film places much more focus on Kari Wuhrer.

References

External links
 
 

2003 films
2003 direct-to-video films
2003 crime thriller films
2003 psychological thriller films
American chase films
American crime thriller films
2000s chase films
Direct-to-video sequel films
Direct-to-video thriller films
Films shot in Alberta
American neo-noir films
2000s road movies
American road movies
American serial killer films
Universal Pictures direct-to-video films
Films about hitchhiking
Films directed by Louis Morneau
2000s English-language films
2000s American films